Colobopsis truncata is a species of ant and type species of the genus Colobopsis. This species was first described in 1808 by  M. Spinola, an Italian entomologist. The range of this species includes the South of Eastern Europe, Central Europe, and Spain.

References

Further reading
 AntWiki

Colobopsis